Invasion of the Bunny Snatchers is a Bugs Bunny short subject directed by Greg Ford and Terry Lennon and released in 1992. The cartoon was intended for theatrical release but eventually aired as part of the television special Bugs Bunny's Creature Features on CBS. Its premise is modeled after the 1956 film Invasion of the Body Snatchers, and it is considered subversive and a lampoon of cheaply drawn animation.

Plot
As a flock of unusual-looking carrots fly through space, Bugs Bunny begins telling a story of how the carrots landed on Earth and wrought havoc. In flashback, Bugs is seen in a typical day on the job filming shorts with Elmer Fudd, Yosemite Sam (whom he dares to walk across a series of lines in the sand leading off a cliff), and Daffy Duck (a "Duck Season"/"Rabbit Season" short), commuting to each set (the forest, desert and countryside respectively). The peculiar carrots appear at each site, but Bugs initially ignores them and returns home to bed.

The next day, Bugs goes through the same routine, but finds each character is now styled in choppy, limited animation (Daffy in particular is animated poorly, with missing frames and at one point animated with Syncro-Vox) reminiscent of 1960s television animation. Each doppelgänger is a pale (both literally and figuratively) imitation, spouting their characters' catchphrases and otherwise behaving in a suspiciously friendly manner (Sam, for example, now wears a smiley button). They willingly partake in their defeats and pressure Bugs into eating the now-glowing carrots; irritated, Bugs agrees to take one home for later.

That night, Bugs is unable to sleep, his internal sense of danger keeping him awake. The carrot breaks open, revealing a white ooze, from which a limited-animation Bugs emerges. The fake Bugs grabs an axe from Bugs's mantle and tries to kill Bugs, but Bugs catches his impostor in the act and runs away in terror (briefly remarking to the audience how this is the scariest part of the picture). The "That's all, Folks!" end card and music appear, but an irritated Bugs protests that there is no way he is allowing the story to end on that note, vowing to get to the bottom of the situation.

Bugs runs to each work site, and each of the doppelgängers is now malfunctioning, repeating short lines like broken records. Inspecting each, he discovers all of them are made on planet Nudnik and reasons that it is a hostile corporate takeover. Bugs deduces that if he gets disposes the clones, the original characters will return. He rounds up each of the clones in a bag tied to a rocket which he lights into space (where E.T. makes a cameo) and sends the clones careening toward a black hole, which swallows the bag and rocket whole. The real Elmer, Sam and Daffy reappear the next day, and Bugs muses about how his friends care about him so much that they want to kill him every day.

A full credit roll ends the short, followed by another "That's all, Folks!" card with a fake Porky Pig, bearing a Terry Gilliam art style... and pants. Finding out that he missed one, Bugs rips it out of the drum and swaps it out with the real Porky, who delivers his signature pose and sign-off to end the cartoon.

Voice cast
Jeff Bergman as Bugs Bunny, Daffy Duck,  Elmer Fudd, Yosemite Sam, and Porky Pig

Home media

The cartoon was released as a part of the Bugs Bunny Halloween Hijinks VHS special. It was later released, albeit in edited form on the Space Jam Two-Disc Special Edition DVD as a special feature. In the Space Jam version Yosemite Sam's scenes have been removed. They were taken out by Warner Bros. due to "time allotment". Sam can still be heard in the edited version when all of the Looney Tune "pods" are about to be launched into space. The uncut version was later released as part of The Essential Bugs Bunny DVD set.

References

External links

1992 films
1992 short films
1992 animated films
1990s American animated films
1990s animated short films
1990s monster movies
1990s English-language films
1990s Warner Bros. animated short films
American animated short films
American science fiction comedy films
American monster movies
Looney Tunes shorts
Bugs Bunny films
Daffy Duck films
Elmer Fudd films
Porky Pig films
Yosemite Sam films
Short films with live action and animation
Films scored by Carl Stalling
Films scored by Milt Franklyn
Warner Bros. Animation animated short films